The 1981 Georgia Tech Yellow Jackets football team represented the Georgia Institute of Technology during the 1981 NCAA Division I-A football season. The Yellow Jackets were led by second-year head coach Bill Curry, and played their home games at Grant Field in Atlanta. Georgia Tech produced abysmal results for the second consecutive year under Curry, finishing with a record of 1–10, their worst season in terms of winning percentage in school history (it would later be matched by another 1–10 season in 1994). Their sole win was a season-opening upset victory over the second-ranked Alabama Crimson Tide in Birmingham.

Schedule

Roster

References

Georgia Tech
Georgia Tech Yellow Jackets football seasons
Georgia Tech Yellow Jackets football